The 1963 season was the 58th season of competitive football in Norway.

1. divisjon

2. divisjon

Group A

Group B

3. divisjon

Group Østland/Søndre

Group Østland/Nordre

Group Sørland/Vestland, A

Group Sørland/Vestland, B

Group Sørland/Vestland, C

Group Møre

Group Trøndelag

District IX

District X

Play-off Sørland/Vestland

Årstad - Donn 1 - 1
Donn - Vard 2 - 1
Vard - Årstad 1 - 2

Donn - Årstad 0 - 5

Årstad promoted

Play-off Møre/Trøndelag

Hødd - Nidelv 1 - 1
Nidelv - Hødd 3 - 1 (agg. 4 - 2)

Nidelv promoted

North Norwegian Championship final
Harstad - Bodø/Glimt 4-3 (aet.)

Harstad north Norwegian league champions (north Norwegian teams could not win promotion).

4. divisjon

District I

District II, Group A

District II, Group B

District III, Group A (Oplandene)

District III, Group B1 (Sør-Østerdal)

District III, Group B2 (Nord-Østerdal)

District III, Group B3 (Sør-Gudbrandsdal)

District III, Group B4 (Nord-Gudbrandsdal)

District IV, Group A (Vestfold)

District IV, Group B (Grenland)

District IV, Group B (Øvre Telemark)

District V, Group A1 (Aust-Agder)

District V, Group A2 (Vest-Agder)

District V, Group B1 (Rogaland)

District V, Group B2 (Rogaland)

District V, Group C (Sunnhordland)

(*) Table unknown

District VI, Group A (Bergen)

District VI, Group B (Midthordland)

District VI, Group C (Sogn og Fjordane)

District VII, Group A (Sunnmøre)

District VII, Group B (Romsdal)

District VII, Group C (Nordmøre)

District VIII, Group A (Sør-Trøndelag)

District VIII, Group B (Trondheim og omegn)

District VIII, Group C (Fosen)

District VIII, Group D (Nord-Trøndelag/Namdal)

District IX

District X

Play-off District II
Strømsgodset - Kjellmyra 3 - 1
Kjellmyra - Strømsgodset 3 - 2 (agg. 4 - 5)

Strømsgodset promoted

Play-off District III
Koppang - Røros 3 - 1
Våga - Fåvang 1 - 1 (after extra time)
Fåvang - Vågå 5 - 3
Fåvang - Koppang 3 - 2
Fåvang - Fremad 1 - 4
Fremad - Fåvang 4 - 0

Fremad promoted

Play-off District IV
Urædd - Snøgg 1 - 2
Stag - Urædd 2 - 2
Snøgg - Stag 6 - 1

Play-off District V
Nærbø - Vidar 1 - 1
Vidar - Nærbø 0 - 0 (agg. 1 - 1)
Vidar - Nærbø 1 - 0 (in Sandnes)

Vidar promoted

Nærbø - Odda 3 - 0 (in Kopervik)

Nærbø promoted

Championship District V
Mandalskameratene - Nedenes 4 - 4
Nedenes - Mandalskameratene 6 - 4 (agg. 10 - 8)
Nedenes - Vidar (not played)

Play-off District VI
Arna - Ny-Krohnborg 2 - 3
Sogndal - Arna 1 - 1
Ny-Krohnborg - Sogndal 4 - 0

Play-off District VII
Søya - Herd 1 - 9
Åndalsnes - Søya 7 - 3
Herd - Åndalsnes 5 - 0

Play-off District VIII
Tryggkameratene - Brekstad 2 - 0
Løkken - Verdal 3 - 2
Verdal - Tryggkameratene 6 - 0
Løkken - Brekstad 4 - 2
Brekstad - Verdal 0 - 3
Tryggkameratene - Løkken 0 - 1

Norwegian Cup

Final

Northern Norwegian Cup

Final

Replay

European Cups

Norwegian representatives
Lyn (Champions Cup)
Gjøvik/Lyn (Cup Winners Cup)

Champions Cup

First round
September 10
Lyn - Borussia Dortmund (FRG) 2-4

October 2
Borussia Dortmund - Lyn 3-1 (agg. 7-3)

Cup Winners' Cup
September 8
Apoel Nicosia (Cyprus) - Gjøvik/Lyn 6-0

September 29
Gjøvik/Lyn - Apoel Nicosia 1-0 (agg. 1-6)

National team

Note: Norway's goals first

 
Seasons in Norwegian football